Luther Water is a generally southerly flowing river in Aberdeenshire, Scotland that discharges into the River North Esk.

Course 
The watercourse rises in the Howe of the Mearns somewhat south of Drumelzie Forest.  Draining chiefly agricultural lands, this stream has a notable lack of turbidity and a pH level of approximately 8.26 measured near the Mains of Luther. Turbidity has been measured at 70 centimetres by the Secchi disc protocol.  summer temperatures are approximately 16 degrees Celsius and electrical conductivity is 21 micro-siemens per centimetre.  Armouring of the stream bottom consists of small rounded stones varying typically from about one centimeter to four centimeters in diameter, some of which are quartzite in composition, leading to a golden-green effect in some locations.

Other nearby watercourses discharging to the North Sea include Cowie Water to the north.

See also 
Monboddo House

References

Rivers of Aberdeenshire